This is a list of television programs formerly, and currently broadcast by the Canadian television channel CTV Comedy Channel and previously The Comedy Network.

Current and upcoming programming
This is a list of programs currently being broadcast regularly and irregularly, as of October 2022.

Original
Acting Good (October 17, 2022-present)
Roast Battle Canada (October 11, 2021-present)

American-originated programming
The Daily Show
Hell of a Week with Charlamagne tha God
Tooning Out the News

Repeats
The Big Bang Theory
Cash Cab
Corner Gas
Corner Gas Animated
Friends
The Goldbergs
Young Sheldon
Modern Family
‘Til Death
Children Ruin Everything

Former programming

Acquired from Hulu
Crossing Swords

Acquired from Comedy Central
Good Talk with Anthony Jeselnik
Klepper
Lights Out with David Spade
Comedy Central Roast (special)

Acquired from TBS
Chad
Miracle Workers

Acquired from TruTV
It's Personal with Amy Hoggart
Tacoma FD

A-E
Aaagh! It's the Mr. Hell Show!
The Abbott and Costello Show
Absolutely Fabulous
Adam Devine's House Party
After Hours (aka After Hours with Kenny Robinson) (original program)
Air Farce
Alice, I Think (original program)
American Body Shop'''Angie TribecaThe Assistant@MidnightBattleBotsBeat the Geeks BrickleberryThe BeavertonBenchedBizarreBlue Collar TVBob and Margaret (original program ran from 2000 until 2017)The BobroomBounty HuntersBroad CityBrockmireButch Patterson: Private Dick (original program)Buzz (after Buzzs run on Rogers TV)Canadian Comedy Shorts (original program)Celebrity DeathmatchChappelle's ShowCheersClippedCocktalesThe Colbert ReportComedy at Club 54Comedy Central PresentsComedy Central RoastComedy Inc. (CTV production)The Comedy JamComedy Now!Comics!CommunityCONCold as BallsDan for MayorThe DetourDiff'rent StrokesThe Dish ShowDrawn TogetherDistraction (UK and US versions)Dog Bites ManDouble ExposureThe DownloadDr. Katz Professional TherapistDrunk HistoryElvira Kurt: Adventures in Comedy (original program)Everybody Loves RaymondExtrasF-JThe Facts of LifeFawlty TowersFrasierFreak ShowFrench and SaundersFresh Off the BoatFull Frontal with Samantha BeeGeorge Street TV (original program)Girls Will Be Girls (original program)The GoldbergsGood Morning World (original program)The Gorburger ShowGround FloorGutterball Alley (original program)The Half HourHalifax Comedy FestivalHappy Tree FriendsHiccupsThe High Court with Doug BensonHistory BitesThe HoneymoonersHotboxHot in ClevelandHouse PartyHome EconomicsI Love LucyImportant Things with Demetri MartinImpastorImprov Heaven and Hell (original program)In Living ColorInside Amy SchumerInternet SluttsThe Itch (original program)It's a LivingJeff Ltd. (CTV production)Jeff Ross Presents Roast BattleThe Jeselnik OffensiveThe Jim Gaffigan ShowThe Jim Jefferies ShowJimmy Kimmel Live!The Joe Blow ShowJon Benjamin Has a VanThe Jon Dore Television ShowJust for LaughsJust for Laughs: All AccessJust for Laughs: GagsJust for Laughs: The Lost TapesK-OKathy Griffin: My Life on the D-ListKevin Spencer (original program which first aired on CTV, then moved over to Comedy Network)Key and PeeleKeys to the VIP (original program)The Kids in the HallThe King of QueensKing of the HillKroll ShowLetterkennyLewis Black's Root of All EvilLife's a BitchLil' BushLiocracyLive at Gothamlol :-)Mad About You (2019 revival for American cable system Spectrum)MADtvMama's FamilyThe Man ShowMatch Game (new English-language version recorded in Montreal in 2012)Men at WorkMike & MollyMind of MenciaMonty Python's Flying CircusMr. Show with Bob and DavidMy BoysMy Name Is EarlNewhartNewsradioThe NewsroomThe Nice Show (original program)The Nightly Show with Larry WilmoreThe Office (UK TV series) (BBC production)The Office (US)Only in America with Larry the Cable GuyOpen Mike with Mike Bullard (co-produced by CTV)The Opposition w/ Jordan KlepperOutnumberedP-TParks and RecreationPatti (original program)The Phil Silvers ShowPicnicface (original program)Point Blank (original program)Popcultured (original program)The President ShowPunched Up (original program)Puppets Who Kill (original program)The Red Green ShowReno 911!ReviewThe Rick Mercer ReportRoast BattleRobson Arms (CTV production)Rockpoint P.D. (original program)The Sarah Silverman ProgramSaturday Night LiveSaturday Night Stand-UpSCTVSeinfeldThe Shakespeare Comedy Show (original program)The Showbiz Show with David SpadeThe Simple Life: InternsThe SimpsonsSirensSister, SisterSit Down, Shut UpSlightly Bent TV (original program)Sullivan & SonSmack the PonySo NoTORIousSoapSouth ParkSpoilersSpun Out Stand Up and Bite Me (original program)StellaSteve Harvey's Big TimeSuburban ShootoutSupertown Challenge (original program)Sushi TVTeam SanchezThis Hour Has 22 MinutesThis Is Not HappeningThis Sitcom Is...Not to Be RepeatedTim and Eric Awesome Show, Great Job!The Tom Green ShowThe Tony Danza ShowTom Green's House TonightTosh.0TruthhorseThe Stand-Up Show with Jon DoreU-ZUgly AmericansUp All NightWayne and ShusterWelcome to The CaptainWelcome to SwedenWhat Were They Thinking?WhitneyWhose Line is it Anyway?Why? with Hannibal BuressWin Ben Stein's MoneyWinnipeg Comedy FestivalWKRP in CincinnatiWorkaholicsWreckedY B Normal? (original program)You Bet Your Ass (original program)Yuk Yuk's Great Canadian Laugh Off''

References

External links
 Official site

Lists of television series by network